Macrothele calpeiana, commonly known as the Gibraltar funnel-web spider or Spanish funnel-web spider, is one of the largest spiders in Europe. Macrothele calpeiana is the only spider species protected under European Union legislation.

The satin black colour and long, flexible spinnerets are characteristic of this spider. The carapace is low and flat and the eyes are in a compact group. The female resembles the male but has a larger abdomen. Like all funnel-web spiders, this spider's web is funnel-shaped with trip-threads around the entrance, built among stones and roots. Its geographical range includes Gibraltar, Spain, Portugal and north-west Africa. This species has been observed occasionally in France. The venom is not deadly to humans.

It is the type species of its genus.

References

Jiménez-Vlaverde, A. & Lobo, J. M. (2006) "Distribution determinants of endangered Iberian spider Macrothele calpeiana (Araneae, Hexathelidae)". Environmental Entomology, 35(6): 1491-1499.
Jiménez-Vlaverde, A. & Lobo, J. M. (2007) "Potential distribution of the endangered spider Macrothele calpeiana (Walckenaer, 1805) (Araneae, Hexathelidae) and the impact of climate warming". Acta Zoologica Sinica, 53: 865-876. http://www.currentzoology.org/paperdetail.asp?id=6697.
Jiménez-Vlaverde, A. (2009) "Absence points of Macrothele calpeiana (Walckenaer, 1805) (Araneae, Hexathelidae) in Morocco (North Africa)". Boletín de la Sociedad Entomológica Aragonesa, 44: 559-561.
Jiménez-Vlaverde, A., García-Díez, T. & Bogaerts, S. (2007) "First records of the endangered spider Macrothele calpeiana (Walckenaer, 1805) (Hexathelidae) in Portugal". Boletín de la Sociedad Entomológica Aragonesa, 41: 445-446.
Siaud, P. & Raphaël, B., (2013) "First observation in Provence of the southern iberian funnelweb: Macrothele calpeiana (Walckenaer, 1805)". Mésogée., 69 : 5- 11, "planches" (board) 1-2.

External links

Macrothelidae
Fauna of Gibraltar
Spiders of Europe
Spiders of Africa
Spiders described in 1805